Philip Harries (born 7 April 1966) is a British athlete who competed at the 1988 Summer Olympics in 400m hurdles and at the 2002 Winter Olympics in bobsleigh.

Athletics
Harries was UK junior and senior champion in the 400 hurdles event in 1985 and 1988. He also competed at the 1994 Commonwealth Games in Victoria, Canada for Wales in the 400m hurdles event and was the Welsh record holder in that event from 1988 to 1999.

As a 400m hurdler he represented Great Britain in Seoul, South Korea at the summer games in 1988 finishing fifth in his heat.

Bobsleigh
Fourteen years later he competed at the 2002 winter games in Salt Lake City, USA in the 4  man bobsleigh event, finishing in 13th place in the GB2 sled. Harries also spent 3 seasons competing for GB in the bobsleigh World Cup.

References

1966 births
Living people
Welsh male hurdlers
Olympic athletes of Great Britain
Athletes (track and field) at the 1988 Summer Olympics
Olympic bobsledders of Great Britain
Bobsledders at the 2002 Winter Olympics
British male bobsledders
Commonwealth Games competitors for Wales
Athletes (track and field) at the 1994 Commonwealth Games
People from Holbrook, Derbyshire
Sportspeople from Derbyshire